The 2013–14 Tercera División was the fourth tier of football in Spain. Play started in August 2013 and ended in June 2014 with the promotion play-off finals.

Competition format
The top four eligible teams in each group, played in the promotion playoffs.
The champion of each group qualified to 2014–15 Copa del Rey. If the champion is a reserve team, the first non-reserve team qualified will join the Copa.
In each group, at least three teams were relegated to Regional Divisions.

League table

Classification

Group 2 – Valencia

Top goalscorers

Top goalkeeper

Group II – Asturias
The Group II is played by teams from Asturias. If there are promotions to Segunda División B there will be as many promotions from Regional Preferente as necessary to have 20 teams in the league. Also, if any of the Asturian teams from 2013–14 Segunda División B are relegated to Tercera, there will be the necessary additional relegations to remain 20 teams.

Teams from second qualified to the necessary to complete 12 teams with the ones of Segunda División B which did not qualify to Copa del Rey will join the Regional stage of the Copa Federación.

New teams: Avilés B, Lenense, Andés (promoted from Regional Preferente)
Teams which left the league: Llanes, Navia and Navarro (relegated to Regional Preferente)

Top goalscorers

Top goalkeeper

Group III – Cantabria

Top goalscorer

Top goalkeeper

Group IV – Basque Country

Top goalscorer

Top goalkeeper

Group V – Catalonia

Top goalscorer

Top goalkeeper

Group VI – Valencian Community

Top goalscorer

Top goalkeeper

Group VII – Community of Madrid

Top goalscorer

Top goalkeeper

Group VIII – Castile and León
The Group VIII is played by teams from Castile and León. If there are promotions to Segunda División B there will be as many promotions from Regional Preferente as necessary to have 20 teams in the league. Also, if any of the teams of the Autonomous Community from 2013–14 Segunda División B are relegated to Tercera, there will be the necessary additional relegations to remain 20 teams.

New teams: Cebrereña, La Bañeza, Becerril, Atlético Tordesillas, CD Burgos (promoted from Primera Regional), Salmantino (new creation team)
Teams which left the league: Burgos, Cultural Leonesa (promoted to 2013–14 Segunda División B), Villaralbo, Cuéllar (relegated to Primera Regional), Salamanca B, Palencia (dissolved)

Top goalscorer

Top goalkeeper

Group IX – Eastern Andalusia and Melilla

Top goalscorer

Top goalkeeper

Group X – Western Andalusia and Ceuta 

Top goalscorer

Top goalkeeper

Group XI – Balearic Islands

Top goalscorer

Top goalkeeper

Group XII – Canary Islands

Top goalscorer

Top goalkeeper

Group XIII – Region of Murcia

Top goalscorer

Top goalkeeper

Group XIV – Extremadura

Top goalscorer

Top goalkeeper

Group XV – Navarre

Top goalscorer

Top goalkeeper

Group XVI – La Rioja

Top goalscorer

Top goalkeeper

Group XVII – Aragon

Top goalscorer

Top goalkeeper

Group XVIII – Castilla-La Mancha

Top goalscorer

Notes
11 November 2013: Tolo Barceló, the goalkeeper of UD Alcúdia, scores with an overhead kick in the last minute against RCD Mallorca B.
12 November 2013: Pablo Orbaiz, former player of Athletic Bilbao returns to football after retirement, as a player and youth coach of CD Valle de Egüés.
19 January 2014: Death of Manuel Candocia in the 82' minute during the game between UD Somozas and CCD Cerceda, mayor of As Somozas and president of UD Somozas. The last minutes of the game were played the 12 March.
February 2014: The heavy surge in the North of Spain busts the field of Real Tapia CF.
10 February 2014: Óscar Alcides Mena, the manager of Atlético Madrid C is promoted to B team.
13 February 2014: Death of Eulogio Vázquez, former president of Pontevedra CF
2 March 2014: The Group II game between Andés CF and Urraca CF was stopped in the first minute to protest against the schedules of the games of La Liga, supposing a damage to the teams of lower divisions. Two weeks later, on 16 March, this action was repeated in the game of the same group between Condal Club and CD Lealtad.

References

 
Tercera División seasons
4
Spain